B. M. Sundaravadanan was an Indian surgeon, educationalist and a philanthropist from Madras. He was an alumnus of the Madras Medical College and the First Honorary surgeon of Madras Medical College. He also served as the chairman of the Tamil Nadu Medical Council.

Sundaravadanan was one of the first medical practitioners to start their hospital in EVR Periyar Salai, which is now regarded as the "Med street" of Chennai.

Sundaravadanan was born in a Tuluva Vellala Mudaliar family of Madras. MM road (Madhavaraya Mudaliar Road) in Frazer town of Bangalore City is named after his father Madhavaraya Mudaliar. He was also the President of Tuluva Vellala association and associated educational institutions. Sundaravadanan was also the founder of Dr. B. M. Sundaravadanan Trust schools at Shenoy Nagar, Chennai.

Sundaravadanan, along with Dr Arcot Lakshmaswami Mudaliar, was one of the founders of Association of Surgeons of India (ASI). The Association of Surgeons of India has named the Best teacher award after Sundaravadanan. Sivapatham Vittal was one of the recipient of Dr. B. M. Sundaravadanan Best Teacher Award.
Sundaravadanan was also the founder president of The Kilpauk Benefit Saswatha Nithi Limited.

References 

Indian medical doctors
1900 births
1995 deaths